The 2010 Alberta Winter Games were held on February 4–7, 2010 in Bonnyville and Cold Lake, Alberta region to showcase Albertan winter athletes. Over 2,000 athletes, coaches, and officials participated in 24 sports at the event.

References

External links
 

Alberta Winter Games
Sport in Alberta
Alberta Winter Games
2010 in Alberta
Cold Lake, Alberta